Kowleh Rural District is a rural district (dehestan) in Saral District, Divandarreh County, Kurdistan Province, Iran. At the 2006 census, its population was 5,996, in 1,245 families. The rural district has 17 villages.

References 

Rural Districts of Kurdistan Province
Divandarreh County